was a Japanese political economist in the late Edo period.

Born in Echigo, Toshiaki went to Edo to study astronomy, mathematics and kendo. At the age of 24, he opened his own school.  He wrote A Secret Plan of Government (Keisei Hisaku; 経世秘策), in which he proposed lifting a ban of a foreign trade and colonization of Ezo, and Tales of the West (Seiiki Monogatari; 西域物語), both in 1798.

Toshiaki was a polymath who knew a bit about the Western world, and wrote that Japan ought to mimic the policies of England, another island country, and "called for more active official promotion of national wealth and strength". In particular, he wrote about four goals for the Japan of his day: 
 Production of gunpowder
 Smelting of iron and other metals
 Setting up a merchant fleet
 Settlement of Ezo in the north

References

Bibliography
 Keene, Donald. The Japanese Discovery of Europe, 1720-1830. Stanford: Stanford University Press. . [revised and expanded edition of The Discovery of Europe: Honda Toshiaki and Other Discoverers, 1720-1798, London, 1952]

1744 births
1821 deaths
People from Niigata Prefecture
18th-century Japanese mathematicians
19th-century Japanese mathematicians
Deified Japanese people